Ecilda Paullier is a small town in the San José Department of southern Uruguay.

Geography

History
It was founded as "Santa Ecilda" on 16 May 1883. On 6 April 1911, it was renamed as "Ecilda Paullier" and declared a "Pueblo" (village) by the Act of Ley N° 3.748. Previously, it had been the head of the judicial section "Pavón". On 17 November 1964, its status was elevated to "Villa" (town) by the Act of Ley N° 13.299.

Population
In 2011 Ecilda Paullier had a population of 2,585.
 
Source: Instituto Nacional de Estadística de Uruguay

Places of worship
 Sacred Heart of Jesus Parish Church (Roman Catholic)

Iglesia Cristiana Evangélica, calle Pedro de Giovangelo, Ecilda Paullier  (Plymouth Brethren)

References

External links
INE map of Ecilda Paullier and Scavino

Populated places in the San José Department